The Iowa elections, 2018 were held in the U.S. state of Iowa on November 6, 2018. A closed primary election was held on June 5, 2018. All of Iowa's executive officers were up for election as well as all four of Iowa's seats in the United States House of Representatives, 25 (half) of the seats in the Iowa Senate, and all 100 seats in the Iowa House of Representatives.

Governorship

Incumbent Republican Governor Terry Branstad, who has served for two consecutive and six total terms as Iowa Governor, resigned to be the United States Ambassador to China in 2017. Lieutenant Governor Kim Reynolds assumed the governorship and was seeking a full term.

Results

Attorney General
Incumbent Democratic Attorney General Tom Miller has served in the position since 1995, and previously from 1979 to 1991. The Republican Party did not nominate anyone, but the Libertarian Party nominated Marco Battaglia.

Democratic primary

Results

General election

Results

Secretary of State

Democratic primary
 Deidre DeJear
 Jim Mowrer

Results

Republican primary
Paul Pate, incumbent

Results

General election

Predictions

Endorsements

Results

Treasurer
Incumbent Democratic State Treasurer Michael L. Fitzgerald, who has served in the position since 1983, ran for reelection to a tenth term in office. Fitzgerald was unopposed in the primary and does not have a Republican challenger, however does have a challenger from the Libertarian party.

Democratic primary

Results

General election

Results

Auditor
Incumbent Auditor Mary Mosiman, who has served since 2013 was eligible for re-election and was unopposed in the Republican primary. Attorney Rob Sand won the Democratic Primary.

Democratic primary

Results

Republican primary

Results

General election

Results

Secretary of Agriculture
Republican Secretary of Agriculture Bill Northey had served in the position since 2007. Northey was considering running for Iowa Governor, but after Governor Terry Branstad was nominated to be Ambassador to China he announced he would not run. Northey had not ruled out running for reelection in 2018, but he said he would be willing to serve as Lieutenant Governor instead if asked. In 2018, he was nominated by President Donald Trump to be Under Secretary of Agriculture for Farm and Foreign Agricultural Services and has since ruled out reelection. The office is currently held by Mike Naig, serving in an acting capacity.

Democratic primary

Results

Republican primary
 Ray Gaesser, farmer and soybean producer
 Chad Ingels
 Craig Lang, former president of the Farm Bureau
 Mike Naig, incumbent
 Dan Zumbach, State Senator

Results

General election

Endorsements

Results

United States House of Representatives

All of Iowa's four seats in the United States House of Representatives were up for election in 2018.

Iowa General Assembly
The 25 odd-numbered Iowa Senate seats were up for election in 2018, as were all 100 Iowa House seats.

References

External links
Candidates at Vote Smart 
Candidates at Ballotpedia
Campaign finance at OpenSecrets

Official Attorney General campaign websites
Marco Battaglia (L) for Attorney General
Tom Miller (D) for Attorney General

Official Secretary of State campaign websites
Deidre DeJear (D) for Secretary of State
Paul Pate (R) for Secretary of State

Official State Auditor campaign websites
Mary Mosiman (R) for Auditor
Rob Sand (D) for Auditor

Official Secretary of Agriculture campaign websites
Tim Gannon (D) for Secretary of Agriculture 
Mike Naig (R) for Secretary of Agriculture

 
Iowa